USS Courlan (AMS-44/MSC(O)-44/YMS-114) was an YMS-1-class auxiliary motor minesweeper acquired by the U.S. Navy for the task of removing mines that had been placed in the water to prevent ships from passing.

The first ship to be named Courlan by the Navy, AMC-44 was constructed at the San Diego Marine Construction Company, San Diego, California.

Courlan served in an "in service" status from 1941 to 1947.

Courlan was reclassified as minesweeper USS Courlan (AMS-44) during September 1947.

She was struck from the Navy list on 1 November 1959.

References

External links 
 

YMS-1-class minesweepers of the United States Navy
Ships built in San Diego
1942 ships
World War II minesweepers of the United States
Cold War minesweepers of the United States